Tritonaclia quinquepunctata is a moth in the subfamily Arctiinae. It was described by Paul Griveaud in 1966. It is found on Madagascar.

References

Moths described in 1966
Arctiinae